Chor Bani Thangaat Kare is a 2017 Gujarati comedy, drama film directed by Rahul Bhole and written by Rahul Bhole, Chetan Dhanani, Mehul Vyas and Vinit Kanojia. It is produced by Arpan Pandya with Creative Producer Harsh Parmar and Supervising Producer Sachi Rathod under the banner of Reelium Films . The film stars Amit Mistry, Bijal Joshi, Prem Gadhavi, Manan Desai, Ojas Rawal, Nimrit Vaishnav, Sharad Sharma, Annapurna Shukla, Jineeta Rawal and Prashant Barot. The soundtrack album is composed by Sachin–Jigar, while lyrics for the songs were written by Niren Bhatt.
Filmed mostly in Ahmedabad, the film is a comedy of errors about the lead character Rajkumar Trivedi, aka Robin, who suffers from Kleptomania and his only way of recovering is by finding true love.
The film released on 21 July 2017 to a universally positive response from critics and audiences.

Cast

 Amit Mistry as Robin aka Rajkumar
 Bijal Joshi as Khushbu
 Prem Gadhavi as Lalit aka Lenti
 Manan Desai as Shahnawaz
 Nirmit Vaishnav as Vanrajsinh Jadeja
 Ojas Rawal as Jayanti Charkat
 Sharad Sharma as Khan Baba
 Annapurna Shukla as Khushbu's Dadi
 Jineeta Rawal as Pooja
 Prashant Barot as Robin's Father
 Harikrishna Dave as Mindi Ustaad

Plot
Plot
Rajkumar Trivedi (Amit Mistry), aka Robin, is disowned by his father (Prashant Barot) in childhood because of his compulsive habit of stealing. He moves to the city of Ahmedabad where his stealing habit puts him in difficulties at every turn of his life. Soon he learns that he is suffering from Kleptomania and the only cure for it is to find true love. He falls for Khushbu (Bijal Joshi) and tries to pursue her. But his stealing habit is revealed soon and Khushbu breaks up with him. Determined to win her back, Robin resolves to give back what he has taken from the society. Inadvertently, he gets embroiled in a brawl of terrorists, politicians, police and Godmen.

Release
The film released on 21 July 2017 to an overwhelmingly positive responses from across the board.
Shruti Jambhekar of The Times of India gave it a 4-star rating saying, "Rahul Bhole in his debut venture has done a commendable job of filming a fun-filled story with right casting. Just the masala movie and family entertainer with right comic timings that Dhollywood was missing out for some time." Jignesh Vasavada from creanara also gave it 4 stars adding,"It is a ROCKING movie. This is the time the Gujarati Film Fraternity should come out in large numbers, spend money and watch the film. That would be a true contribution to lovely films like this." 
The film went on to garner approximately 8–900,000 INR on its opening day while bringing another 10–1.1 million INR on the second day (Saturday).

Soundtrack

The soundtrack is composed entirely by Sachin–Jigar, while the lyrics were written by Niren Bhatt. The first song "Bhuli Javu Che" was released as a single on 14 June 2017. The song was sung by Sachin Sanghvi, The song received positive reviews and amassed more than a million views on YouTube within 24 hours. "Mauj-E-Dariya" was sung by Benny Dayal, the first Gujarati song sung by him.

References

External links
 
 
 
 

2017 films
Films set in Ahmedabad
Films shot in Gujarat
Indian comedy-drama films
2017 comedy-drama films
2010s Gujarati-language films